Queen Charlotte was launched at Calcutta in 1801. In 1803 her master was R. Alexander and her owners were Colvins, Bazett and Co. She was lost in the Bay of Bengal around 1804.

Citations and references
Citations

References
 

1801 ships
British ships built in India
Age of Sail merchant ships of England
Maritime incidents in 1804